Michael Marcus (August 25, 1952) is an American jazz clarinetist and saxophonist. He plays B & A clarinets, bass clarinet; sopranino, soprano, tenor, baritone, bass, and C melody saxophones, stritch (straight alto) saxophone, saxello, bass flute, tárogató & alto tarogato, and octavin.

In 1991 Enja released Under the Wire, his debut album as a leader. He has worked with artists including:  Albert King, Bobby "Blue" Bland, Frank Lowe, Henry Grimes, Jaki Byard, Rahn Burton, Vince Wallace, Fred Hopkins, Denis Charles, Jay Rosen, Tarus Mateen, Perry Robinson, Warren Smith and Edgar Bateman to name a few.
  
Marcus and Ted Daniel comprise Duology, which has collaborated with Andrew Cyrille and Henry Grimes. With Sonny Simmons, he is the co-leader of The Cosmosamatics.

Michael was rewarded an individual performance grant from the NEA (National Endowment of the Arts)-composing for a string quartet in conjunction with his original music.

Discography

As leader

 Under the Wire [Enja Records],1990 
 Here At! (Soul Note Records), 1993
 Ithem (Ayler Records) 1994
 Reachin' (Justin Time Records), 1996 
 This Happening (Justin Time) 1997 w Jaki Byard
 Involution (Justin Time, 1998) w/Jaki Byard Trio 
 Live in N.Y. (Soul Note, 1999)
 In the Center of it All (Justin Time) 2000
 Sunwheels (Justin Time)  2001
 Blue Reality (Soul Note) 2002
 Speakin Out (Drimala) 2002
 Soulifications (Soul Note) 2005
 The Magic Door (Not Two) 2007
 Lotus Symphony (Not Two) 2008
 For Yes! (Not Two) 2010 
 Elements in Candor (For Tune) 2016 
 Stone Jump (Not Two), 2021
 Abstractions in Lime Caverns (ESP-Disk'), 2022

"The Cosmosamatics" w/ Sonny Simmons
 The Cosmosamatics (Boxholder, 2001)
 The Cosmosamatics II (Boxholder, 2002)
 Live at Banlieues (Bleu Regard, 2003)
 Three (Boxholder, 2004)
 Reeds & Birds (Not Two, 2004)
 Magnitudes (Soul Note, 2005)
 Zetrons (Not Two, 2005)
 Free within the Law (Not Two, 2008)
 Jazz-Maalika (Saptak, 2013)

"Duology" w/ Ted Daniel
 Duology ( Boxholder) 2007
 Golden Atoms ( Soul Note ) 2008
 Duology w/ Andrew Cyrille (Jazz Werkstatt ) 2011
 Duology w/ Henry Grimes ( Ujjama ) 2019

 The Saxemble w/ Frank Lowe, James Carter (Qwest/Warner)

 N.Y. Clarinet Society w/ Perry Robinson (FSR Records)

 Blue Reality Quartet w/Joe McPhee'/Warren Smith/ Jay Rosen '''' (Mahakala) 2021
  Blue Reality Quartet "Ella's Island"''(Mahakala) 2022

References

External links
   (complete bio & discography)

Avant-garde jazz musicians
1952 births
Living people
Jazz alto saxophonists
Post-bop clarinetists
Avant-garde jazz clarinetists
21st-century saxophonists
21st-century clarinetists